Richard Weedt Widmark (December 26, 1914March 24, 2008) was an American film, stage, and television actor and producer.

He was nominated for an Academy Award for his role as the villainous Tommy Udo in his debut film, Kiss of Death (1947), for which he also won the Golden Globe Award for Most Promising Newcomer. Early in his career, Widmark was typecast in similar villainous or anti-hero roles in films noir, but he later branched out into more heroic leading and supporting roles in Westerns, mainstream dramas, and horror films among others.

For his contributions to the motion picture industry, Widmark has a star on the Hollywood Walk of Fame at 6800 Hollywood Boulevard. In 2002, he was inducted into the Western Performers Hall of Fame at the National Cowboy & Western Heritage Museum in Oklahoma City, Oklahoma.

Early life
Widmark was born December 26, 1914, in Sunrise Township, Minnesota, the son of Ethel Mae (née Barr) and Carl Henry Widmark. His father was of Swedish descent, and his mother was of English and Scottish ancestry. Widmark grew up in  Princeton, Illinois, and lived in  Henry, Illinois for a short time, moving frequently because of his father's work as a traveling salesman. He attended Lake Forest College, where he studied acting and taught acting after he was graduated with a Bachelor of Arts degree in speech in 1936. The Army turned him down during World War II because of a perforated ear drum.

Radio
Widmark made his debut as a radio actor in 1938 on Aunt Jenny's Real Life Stories. In 1941 and 1942, he was heard daily on the Mutual Broadcasting System in the title role of the daytime serial Front Page Farrell, introduced each afternoon as "the exciting, unforgettable radio drama... the story of a crack newspaperman and his wife, the story of David and Sally Farrell." Farrell was a top reporter for the Brooklyn Eagle. When the series moved to NBC, Widmark turned the role to Carleton G. Young and Staats Cotsworth.

During the 1940s, Widmark was also heard on such network radio programs as Gang Busters, The Shadow, Inner Sanctum Mysteries, Joyce Jordan, M.D., Molle Mystery Theater, Suspense, and Ethel and Albert. In 1952, he portrayed Cincinnatus Shryock in an episode of Cavalcade of America titled "Adventure on the Kentucky". He returned to radio drama decades later, performing on CBS Radio Mystery Theater (1974–82), and was also one of the five hosts on Sears Radio Theater (as the Friday "adventure night" host) from 1979 to 1981.

Broadway
Widmark appeared on Broadway in 1943 in F. Hugh Herbert's Kiss and Tell and in William Saroyan's Get Away Old Man, directed by George Abbott, which ran for 13 performances. He was unable to join the military during World War II because of a perforated eardrum. He was in Chicago appearing in a stage production of Dream Girl with June Havoc when 20th Century Fox signed him to a seven-year contract.

Films

Kiss of Death and villainous roles

Widmark's first movie appearance was in the 1947 film noir Kiss of Death, as the giggling, sociopathic villain Tommy Udo. In his most notorious scene, Udo pushed a woman in a wheelchair (played by Mildred Dunnock) down a flight of stairs to her death. Widmark was almost not cast. He said, "The director, Henry Hathaway, didn't want me. I have a high forehead; he thought I looked too intellectual." Hathaway was overruled by studio boss Darryl F. Zanuck. "Hathaway gave me kind of a bad time," recalled Widmark. Kiss of Death was a commercial and critical success: Widmark won the Golden Globe Award for New Star of the Year - Actor, and was nominated for the Academy Award for Best Supporting Actor for his performance.

Widmark followed Kiss of Death with other villainous performances in the films noir The Street with No Name and Road House, and the western Yellow Sky (all 1948), the latter film with Gregory Peck and Anne Baxter. Another standout villainous role was in the racial melodrama No Way Out (1950), with Sidney Poitier in his film debut. Widmark and Poitier became good friends and worked in a number of films together in later years.

Heroic roles and continued success

Widmark played heroic roles in films, including Down to the Sea in Ships, Slattery's Hurricane (both 1949), and Elia Kazan's Panic in the Streets (1950). His role as first mate Lunceford in the whaling movie Down to the Sea in Ships was his first starring role as the principal hero.  His next starring role was in the 1951 WWII drama, Frogmen.  This movie is cited by many Navy Seals as the reason they joined the Navy.  The film is very accurate in its depiction of the Underwater Demolition Teams that removed obst&cles put on the beaches by the Japanese. It has a great cast, and Widmark is very credible as the new commander of the Team trying to replace a beloved leader who was killed in action.  War movie buffs identify this little known film as one of the best war movies ever made.

He also featured in Halls of Montezuma (1951) and Don't Bother to Knock (1952) (with Marilyn Monroe), and appeared in two films for director Samuel Fuller: Pickup on South Street (1953) and Hell and High Water (1954).

Widmark continued to appear in a number of successful films, including The Tunnel of Love (1959) with Doris Day, the Westerns Warlock (also 1959) with Henry Fonda, as Jim Bowie in John Wayne's The Alamo (1960), the courtroom drama Judgment at Nuremberg (1961), and reuniting with Sidney Poitier in the adventure The Long Ships (1964).

Widmark produced and starred in the films Time Limit (1957), The Secret Ways (1961) — based on a novel by Alistair MacLean, which Widmark also directed (uncredited) due to clashes with original director Phil Karlson's proposed tongue-in-cheek direction of the screenplay  — and The Bedford Incident (1965), his third film with Sidney Poitier and loosely based on the Herman Melville novel Moby Dick.

1970s
Widmark began to drift into supporting roles during the 1970s, though he still played the occasional lead, for instance in the 1976 British-West German film To the Devil a Daughter. He was part of an all-star cast in the 1974 film Murder on the Orient Express (playing the murder victim), the 1977 film Rollercoaster  (as an FBI agent), and The Swarm (1978). He had a prominent supporting role in Michael Crichton's Coma (also 1978), with Geneviève Bujold and Michael Douglas.

Later career
Widmark continued to appear in a number of films during the 1980s, again with Sidney Poitier who directed him in the comedy Hanky Panky (1982), with Gene Wilder. He also featured in the political thriller Who Dares Wins (also 1982), and Against All Odds (1984), with Jeff Bridges and James Woods.

In all, Widmark appeared in more than 60 films during his career, and he made his final film appearance in the 1991 drama True Colors.

In an interview with Michael Shelden in 2002, Widmark complained that "movie-making has lost a lot of its magic". He thought it had become "mostly a mechanical process...All they want to do is move the camera around like it was on a rollercoaster. A great director like John Ford knew how to handle it. Ford didn't move the camera, he moved the people".

Television

Widmark was a mystery guest on the CBS quiz show What's My Line? in 1954. The following year, he made a rare foray into comedy on I Love Lucy, portraying himself when a starstruck Lucy trespasses onto his property to steal a souvenir. Widmark finds Lucy sprawled out on his living room floor underneath a bearskin rug.

Returning to television in the early 1970s, Widmark received an Emmy Award nomination for his performance as Paul Roudebush, the president of the United States, in the TV movie Vanished! (1971), a Fletcher Knebel political thriller. In 1972, he reprised his detective role from Don Siegel's Madigan (1968) with six 90-minute episodes on the NBC Wednesday Mystery Movie. He participated in a mini-series about Benjamin Franklin, transmitted in 1974, which was a unique experiment of four 90-minute dramas, each with a different actor impersonating Franklin: Widmark, Beau Bridges, Eddie Albert, Melvyn Douglas, and Willie Aames who portrayed Franklin at age 12. The series won a Peabody Award and five Emmys. During the 1980s, Widmark returned to TV with a half-dozen TV movies.

Personal life

Widmark was married to screenwriter Jean Hazlewood for 55 years from 1942 until her death in 1997. They had a daughter, Anne Heath Widmark, an artist and author who was married to baseball player Sandy Koufax from 1969 to 1982. In 1999, Widmark married Susan Blanchard, the daughter of Dorothy Hammerstein and stepdaughter of Oscar Hammerstein II; she had been Henry Fonda's third wife.

Widmark owned a cattle ranch near Green City, Missouri during the 1950s and 1960s. He contributed funds to the construction of an airport there, bearing his name in his honor.

Despite having spent a substantial part of his career appearing in gun-toting roles such as cowboys, police officers, gangsters and soldiers, Widmark disliked firearms and was involved in several gun-control initiatives. In 1976, he stated:

Widmark was a lifelong member of the Democratic Party.

Retiring in 2001, Widmark died after a long illness on March 24, 2008, at his home in Roxbury, Connecticut, at the age of 93. Widmark's failing health in his final years was aggravated by a fall he suffered in 2007. He was buried at Roxbury Center Cemetery.

In popular culture
Widmark's performance in Kiss of Death inspired the name of mystery and crime writer Donald E. Westlake's best-known continuing pseudonym, Richard Stark, under which he wrote some of his darkest, most violent books. According to Westlake, "part of (Widmark's) fascination and danger is his unpredictability. He's fast and mean, and that's what I wanted the writing to be: crisp and lean, no fat, trimmed down ... stark."

Filmography

Films

Television

Radio appearances

References

External links

 
 
 
 
 Literature on Richard Widmark
Obituaries:
 Variety, 26 March 2008 
The Daily Telegraph, 27 March 2008
The Times, 27 March 2008
 The Independent, 27 March 2008
The Guardian, 27 March 2008

1914 births
2008 deaths
20th Century Studios contract players
20th-century American male actors
Accidental deaths from falls
American male film actors
American male radio actors
American male stage actors
American male television actors
American people of English descent
American people of Scottish descent
American people of Swedish descent
California Democrats
Connecticut Democrats
Illinois Democrats
Lake Forest College alumni
Male Western (genre) film actors
Male actors from Minnesota
Minnesota Democrats
New Star of the Year (Actor) Golden Globe winners
People from Chisago County, Minnesota
People from Princeton, Illinois
People from Roxbury, Connecticut